Pope Urban III (died 20 October 1187), born Uberto Crivelli, reigned from 25 November 1185 to his death in 1187.

Early career

Crivelli was born in Cuggiono, Italy as the son of Guala Crivelli and had four brothers: Pietro, Domenico, Pastore and Guala. It is often said that the future Pope Celestine IV was the son of Urban's sister, but this claim is without foundation. He studied in Bologna.

In 1173, Crivelli was made a cardinal by Pope Alexander III. His original title is unknown, but he opted to be the Cardinal-Priest of San Lorenzo in Lucina in 1182. Lucius appointed him Archbishop of Milan in 1185. Lucius III died on 25 November 1185; Cardinal Crivelli was elected that same day. The haste was probably due to fear of imperial interference.

Pontificate

Urban III vigorously took up his predecessor's quarrels with Holy Roman Emperor Frederick I Barbarossa, including the standing dispute about the disposal of the territories of the countess Matilda of Tuscany. This was embittered by personal enmity, for at the sack of Milan in 1162 the emperor had caused several of the pope's relatives to be proscribed or mutilated. Even after his elevation to the papacy, Urban III continued to hold the archbishopric of Milan, and in this capacity refused to crown as King of Italy Frederick I's son Henry, who had married Constance, the heiress of the kingdom of Sicily. By this marriage/bond the papacy lost that Norman support on which it had so long relied in its contests with the emperor.

Urban exerted himself to bring about peace between England and France, and on 23 June 1187, his legates by threats of excommunication prevented a pitched battle between the armies of the rival kings near Châteauroux, and brought about a two years' truce.

While Henry in the south cooperated with the rebel Senate of Rome, his father Frederick blocked the passes of the Alps and cut off all communication between the Pope, then living in Verona, and his German adherents. Urban III now resolved on excommunicating Frederick I, but the Veronese protested against such a proceeding being resorted to within their walls. He accordingly withdrew to Ferrara, but died before he could give effect to his intentions. He was succeeded by Gregory VIII. According to the chroniclers Ernoul and Benedict of Peterborough, Urban III died of shock and grief after Joscius, Archbishop of Tyre brought him news of the Christian defeat at the Battle of Hattin. It is also commonly stated that Urban's death was caused by the news of the fall of Jerusalem, but William of Newburgh assures us that the report of the disaster of Hattin (3-4 July) did not even reach the Holy See till after the election of Gregory VIII, so it is hardly probable that Urban III ever heard of the surrender of the Holy City, which took place on 2 October.

See also

List of popes
Cardinals created by Urban III

Notes

1187 deaths
People from Cuggiono
Popes
Italian popes
Cardinals created by Pope Alexander III
Archbishops of Milan
12th-century popes
12th-century Italian Roman Catholic archbishops
1120 births